The National Book Critics Circle Award for Biography, established in 1983, is an annual American literary award presented by the National Book Critics Circle (NBCC) to promote "the finest books and reviews published in English." Awards are presented annually to books published in the U.S. during the preceding calendar year in six categories: Fiction, Nonfiction, Poetry, Memoir/Autobiography, Biography, and Criticism.

Books previously published in English are not eligible, such as re-issues and paperback editions. They do consider "translations, short story and essay collections, self published books, and any titles that fall under the general categories."

The judges are the volunteer directors of the NBCC who are 24 members serving rotating three-year terms, with eight elected annually by the voting members, namely "professional book review editors and book reviewers." Winners of the awards are announced each year at the NBCC awards ceremony in conjunction with the yearly membership meeting, which takes place in March.

Between 1983 and 2004, the award was presented jointly with autobiography.

Recipients

References

External links 
 Official website

American literary awards
Awards established in 1981
20th-century literary awards
21st-century literary awards
English-language literary awards
Biography awards